Convict 99 is a 1938 British comedy film directed by Marcel Varnel and starring Will Hay, Moore Marriott, Graham Moffatt and Googie Withers.

Plot
Incompetent Dr Benjamin Twist (Will Hay) is dismissed from his job as headmaster at St. Michael's School (the school returns in a later film The Ghost of St. Michael's), and applies for a job in another school.

Going for interview, he is called into another office where they are expecting  John Benjamin, a strict prison governor recently arrived from Australia who is applying for the vacancy at Blackdown Prison in Devon. On the way to what Twist believes is the school, he becomes drunk, and on arrival is mistaken for Max Slessor, a prisoner who had escaped during a jailbreak.

Designated Convict 99 and in for seven years for forgery, Twist is soon discovered to be the new Prison Governor, and once put in his (dubiously) rightful place embarks on a programme to make the prison a more friendly place for the prisoners, funding it from the proceeds of a football pools win and stock market investments.

Things take a turn for the worse, when the recaptured Slessor escapes again with a signed cheque. Altering the figures, he draws the entire prison funds from the bank. Twist and some of the convicts head in a prison van to Limehouse, in east London, to catch Slessor, recover the lost funds and then successfully break into the bank in the middle of the night to return the money.

Cast
 Will Hay - Dr Benjamin Twist
 Moore Marriott - Jerry the Mole
 Graham Moffatt - Albert
 Googie Withers - Lottie "the Baroness"
 Peter Gawthorne - Sir Cyril
 Basil Radford - Deputy Governor
 Dennis Wyndham - Head Warder
 Wilfred Walter - Max Slessor
 Alf Goddard - Sykes
 Basil McGrail - Bates
 Kathleen Harrison - Mable
 Roddy McDowall - Jimmy
 Teddy Brown - Slim Charlie
 Bertha Belmore - Tiara Lady
 George Merritt - Patrolman
 Roy Emerton - John Benjamin
 Leonard Sharp - Convict
 Garry Marsh - Johnson

External links
 
 Analysis of Convict 99 as a prison movie
 Screenonline Review

1938 films
British black-and-white films
British comedy films
1930s English-language films
Films directed by Marcel Varnel
Films set in London
Films set in Devon
Gainsborough Pictures films
1938 comedy films
Prison comedy films
Films with screenplays by Marriott Edgar
1930s British films